In particle physics, the available energy is the energy in a particle collision available to produce new matter from the kinetic energy of the colliding particles.

See also 
Threshold energy
Matter creation

References 

Particle physics